Lake Poco Sol (from Spanish, "Little Sunshine"),  or , is a volcanic lake in Costa Rica, in the Cordillera de Tilarán. 

Other volcanic features in the area include breccia, lahar deposits, lava flows and tuffs. The lake may be a landslide scar, or a crater left by a phreatic explosion. It is of probable Pleistocene age. It is constructed within the andesitic Monteverde Formation, which was erupted between 2.1 and 1 million years ago.

Hot springs, mud pots and deposits of sulfur are found both at the lake and near the Río Penas Blancas. The area has been investigated for the possibility of obtaining geothermal energy from it. The geothermal activity may be the source of the name Pocosol.

The active volcano Arenal lies north-northwest of Laguna Poco Sol. Arenal along with Cerro Chato between Arenal and Laguna Poco Sol and Cerro Pocosol south of Laguna Poco Sol may be located along a zone of tectonic weakness that was accompanied by northeast-migrating volcanism.

See also 
List of lakes in Costa Rica
List of volcanoes in Costa Rica

References 

Poco Sol
Poco Sol
Pleistocene volcanism
Volcanoes of Costa Rica